Al-Wathba Sport Club is a Syrian professional football club based in Homs, that competes in the Syrian Premier League.

History
Al-Wathba is a professional football club based in Homs, Syria, and they are one of the oldest Syrian clubs.
Al-Wathba were founded in 1937 under the name of "Al-Fedaa Club" by a number of young amateur athletes who took "Dar Al-Jodi" (located in al-Hamidiyah neighborhood in Homs), as a place to practice their sport activities. In 1953, the club obtained the license, adding football, basketball games, athletics, swimming, and cycling, and they won the Homs championship from 1963 to 1968.

Al-Wathba is the first football club represented the city of Homs in the Syrian Premier League which started in 1973. The club was very close to winning the Premier League many times during the 1980s, or the "golden age" according to their fans, the best place they achieved is 2nd in the 1981–82 season.

In February 2013, during the Syrian civil war, Yussef Sleman, one of the players was killed in a mortar strike at the Tishreen Stadium.

In 2019, Al-Wathba won the Syrian Cup, to be their first title in their history. In 2019–20 season, Al-Wathba finished second in the league, their best position since 1981–82.

Achievements
Syrian Premier League:
Runners-up (3) : 1981–82, 2019–20, 2021–22
Syrian Cup:
Winners (1): 2018–19
Runners-up (1) : 2021–22
Al-Wathba Cup:
Winners (1): 2020

Current squad

Performance in the AFC competition

AFC Cup: 1 appearance
2020: abandoned due to COVID-19 pandemic in Asia

Continental record

References

External links
 Al Wathba Official site

Wathba
Homs
Association football clubs established in 1937
1937 establishments in Mandatory Syria